Noah Davis may refer to:

Noah Davis (judge) (1818–1902), American lawyer and politician
Noah Davis (Baptist minister) (1804–1867), American freedman and Baptist minister
Noah Davis (baseball) (born 1997), American baseball player
Noah Davis (painter) (1983–2015), American painter and installation artist
Noah K. Davis (1830–1910), American educator